Arthur Currie (1875–1933) was a Canadian Army general. General Currie may also refer to:

Dennis Hadley Currie (1874–1928), U.S. Army brigadier general
Fendall Currie (1841–1920), British Indian Army major general
James B. Currie (1925–2009), U.S. Air Force major general

See also
John F. Curry (1886–1973), U.S. Army Air Forces major general
William D. Curry (1926–2013), U.S. Air Force brigadier general